The Messina tram depot (in Italian: Deposito tranviario Messina) is the largest tram depot in Milan, Italy, and one of the largest in the world. It is located at street number 14 of Via Messina, close to the Monumentale cemetery. The building of the depot, which dates back to 1912, is a prominent example of early 20th century Milanese industrial architecture, and one of the most important examples of cast-iron architecture in Italy. The depot is still in use by Azienda Trasporti Milanesi (ATM) public transport company. Due to its historical and architectural relevance, ATM occasionally opens the depot to visitors.

The main structure of the building is composed of cast-iron piers surmounted by iron trusses; the roof comprises both glass panes and cotto tiles. It houses about 150 trams as well as other vehicles devoted to railway maintenance and other support tasks.

See also
Trams in Milan
Transport in Milan

References

Buildings and structures in Milan
Transport in Milan
Tram depots